Yana Uqhu (Quechua yana black, uqhu swamp, "black swamp", Hispanicized spelling Yanaoco) is a mountain in the Andes of Peru, about  high. It is located in the Pasco Region, Daniel Alcides Carrión Province, Yanahuanca District, near the border with the Lima Region. The lake southwest of Yana Uqhu is Mituqucha ("mud lake", Hispanicized Mitococha).

References

Mountains of Peru
Mountains of Pasco Region